"Quark, Strangeness and Charm" is a 1977 song by the UK rock group Hawkwind, being the title track from the Quark, Strangeness and Charm album.

The title references quarks which are sub-atomic particles; "strangeness" and "charm" are playful terms used by physicists to refer to how many strange and charm quarks are within a particle. The lyrics take a humorous look at certain famous physicists' romantic failures.

1977 single
It was released as a single in the UK (CB305) on 29 July 1977, being a slightly different version to the one on the album. Some European copies had a different B-side, such as Germany, which featured "The Iron Dream" instead. The single version was subsequently included on the 1980 Repeat Performance compilation album.

At the time Hawkwind shared the same management as Marc Bolan and so were given a slot on the Marc Granada Television programme to promote it. Brock declined to appear, either being unwilling to drive to Manchester for the filming or holding a long time grudge against Bolan. For the pre-recording of the music on this show, Shaw played guitar while Calvert mimed playing guitar during the filming.

Track listing
 "Quark, Strangeness and Charm" (Calvert/Brock) – 3:06
 "The Forge of Vulcan" (House) – 3:05

Personnel
 Robert Calvert – vocal, percussion
 Dave Brock – electric lead and rhythm guitars
 Simon House – acoustic and electric pianos
 Adrian Shaw – bass guitar
 Simon King – drums

Credits
 Recorded at Rockfield Studios, February 1977
 Produced by Hawkwind
 Engineered by Dave Charles

Live versions
The song only briefly featured in Hawkwind's live set in 1977 with one recording surviving, released on both the Hawkwind Anthology and Weird Tape Volume 2 albums. It was briefly resurrected at the end of 1993 for the tour of the It Is the Business of the Future to Be Dangerous album and remained until the end of 1994.

1994 EP

In 1994, Hawkwind recorded a new version of the song with significant rewriting of the music. This version was also included on the album The Business Trip.

Track listing
"Uncle Sam's on Mars" (Red Planet Radio Mix) – 2:43
"Quark, Strangeness and Charm" (Calvert/Brock) – 6:24
"Black Sun" – 9:34
"Uncle Sam's on Mars" (Martian Conquest Mix) – 6:53

Personnel
Dave Brock – guitar, vocals, keyboards, synthesisers
Alan Davey – bass guitar, vocals, synthesisers
Richard Chadwick – drums, percussion
Astralasia – remixes

Release history
Sep 1994 – UK – Emergency Broadcast Sysrem Records – 12" vinyl (EBT 110) and CD (EBCD 110)
Nov 1994 – USA – Griffin – CD (GCD 312-2)

Other versions
A new acoustic version of "Quark, Strangeness and Charm" was included on The Road to Utopia (2018), produced and arranged by Mike Batt with additional orchestrations.

Cover versions
The Stranglers' Jean-Jacques Burnel has long been an admirer of the song, stating it was "a song I'd really fucking wish I'd written". He has performed versions of the song with Three Men and Black.

References

Hawkwind songs
1977 singles
Songs written by Robert Calvert
Songs written by Dave Brock
1977 songs
Charisma Records singles
1994 EPs